Odontites vulgaris is a species of flowering plant belonging to the family Orobanchaceae.

Its native range is Europe to Siberia and China.

References

vulgaris